The Running Man is a 1987 American dystopian action film directed by Paul Michael Glaser and starring Arnold Schwarzenegger, María Conchita Alonso, Richard Dawson, Yaphet Kotto, and Jesse Ventura.

The film's story about a television show where convicted criminal "runners" must escape death at the hands of professional killers is very loosely based on the 1982 novel of the same name written by Stephen King and published under the pseudonym Richard Bachman.

A lawsuit determined the movie was plagiarized from the French movie Le prix du danger (1983)(The Price of Danger) which was made after Robert Sheckley's 1958 short story "The Prize of Peril", just like the 1970 German TV movie Das Millionenspiel (The Million Game). The 1987 US film is set in a dystopian United States between 2017 and 2019.

The Running Man was a moderate box office success in the United States, grossing $38 million on its $27 million budget, but opened to mixed reviews from critics. A new movie adaptation of the novel, announced in early 2021, is in development at Paramount Pictures, with Edgar Wright directing and Michael Bacall writing the script.

Plot

By 2017, the United States has become a totalitarian police state following a worldwide economic collapse and the recent election. The government pacifies the populace through violent TV shows; its most popular being The Running Man, a broadcast game show, where criminals fight for their lives as "runners," fleeing from armed mercenaries called "stalkers," to earn a government pardon and tropical vacation. 

Captain Ben Richards, a police helicopter pilot, observes an unarmed food riot in Bakersfield, California. He is ordered to open fire on them, but refuses and is subdued by his colleagues. The media blames Richards for shooting sixty people and he is sent to a prison labor camp. Eighteen months later, he escapes with two resistance fighters, Harold Weiss and William Laughlin, finding refuge in their camp, led by their leader, Mic. The resistance group looks to hijack the ICS broadcast network's uplink facilities to expose the government's lies. Richards declines to help, and then heads to his brother's apartment, only to find it is now occupied by Amber Mendez, a composer, and that his brother has been sent to a "re-education" camp.

With Mendez's security travel pass, Richards takes Mendez hostage to flee to Hawaii but is arrested at the airport when Mendez alerts security. Meanwhile, Damon Killian, the charismatic, amoral host of The Running Man, becomes enamored by Richards's physical prowess and 'notorious reputation' as a murderous madman. Killian coerces Richards to participate in the show, in exchange for Weiss and Laughlin's freedom. Meanwhile, Amber sees a news report stating that Richards shot people at the airport, which she knows is untrue. As the game begins, Killian sends Weiss and Laughlin into the game-show arena with Richards, in an abandoned part of Los Angeles. They are first attacked by the stalker Subzero, but Richards garrotes him with a section of razor-wire fencing, the first time a stalker has ever died on the show.

Mendez finds the original, unedited footage of the Bakersfield massacre. However, she is caught and sent into the game zone, joining the other three "contestants." Killian now deploys two stalkers — Buzzsaw and Dynamo — to hunt the four runners.

Weiss realizes that the government/TV satellite uplink station, which the underground resistance has been searching for, is located in the game show arena. Dynamo electrocutes Weiss, just as he cracks the satellite's security, but Mendez has memorized the access code. Buzzsaw mortally wounds Laughlin, but Richards bisects Buzzsaw with his own chainsaw. Dynamo is incapacitated by Richards, who spares the stalker live on air. Laughlin tells Richards that the resistance has a hidden base in the arena before dying from his wounds. Off the air, Killian offers Richards a position as a stalker, which the enraged Richards refuses. Hunted by Fireball, a flamethrower-wielding stalker with a jetpack, Mendez finds the corpses of the show's alleged past "winners," revealing that the show's promises of pardons are all false. Richards saves Mendez and kills Fireball by sabotaging his gas tank and setting him alight with a road flare. Immediately afterward, the pair stumbles into Mic's command center.

With the viewership now cheering for Richards, Killian asks Captain Freedom, a retired stalker and fan favorite, to join the hunt. When Captain Freedom refuses to fight using mechanical weaponry instead of his bare hands, the network doctors old footage to depict Richards and Mendez being killed by Captain Freedom. Mendez and Richards see this on TV, convincing Richards to lead resistance forces to storm the ICS control room. Using the access codes, they broadcast the original footage of the Bakersfield massacre and the deceased runners to expose Killian and the government's lies. As the resistance fighters battle ICS security forces, Dynamo tries to rape Amber. However, her gun triggers the building's sprinkler system, which electrocutes Dynamo.

Richards confronts Killian, who desperately pleads that the show appeases the public's lust for violence, but Richards forces Killian into a rocket-powered sled, jettisoning him into the game zone, causing him to fatally crash through his own billboard image. As the audience celebrates, Richards reunites with Mendez, departing the studio as the broadcasting network goes down.

Cast

Production
Christopher Reeve was once attached to play Ben Richards. In a 2015 interview about the film, Paul Michael Glaser said that he was originally approached to direct the film but declined because he felt that the preproduction period was insufficient. Director Andrew Davis was hired instead but was fired after just two weeks, because the production was one week behind schedule, so Glaser was now hired. Schwarzenegger has stated this was a "terrible decision," as Glaser "shot the movie like it was a television show, losing all the deeper themes." L.A. Weekly stated that the film's tone changed from a dark allegory to a humorous action film with the change of the film's star. With Reeve, The Running Man was about an unemployed man who goes on a violent game show for a thirty-day period to feed his family. With Glaser and Schwarzenegger, the protagonist became a condemned, but innocent, criminal forced into a three-hour gladiator-style game show by the justice system. Screenwriter Steven E. de Souza wrote fifteen drafts of the script over the course of the film's development.

Pop star Paula Abdul choreographed the preshow dance sequences. This was her second film credit, though she had already choreographed four Janet Jackson videos, as well as videos by ZZ Top, Duran Duran, and Debbie Gibson. The music used for the preshow entertainment was composed by Jackie Jackson and was dubbed "Paula's Theme" in honor of Paula Abdul.

The film's release was postponed from summer 1987 until Thanksgiving, 1987 due to the producers' desire for the film to be the only action thriller released during the holiday season. The film opened on 1,600 screens on November 13, 1987, to moderately positive reviews.

Music

Soundtrack
The film's soundtrack was composed by Harold Faltermeyer and includes music by Wolfgang Amadeus Mozart, Richard Wagner, Jackie Jackson, Glen Barbee, and John Parr, who performed the main theme of the film, "Restless Heart (Running Away With You)" (written by John Parr and Harold Faltermeyer and produced by Faltermeyer) and played during the final scene and end credits. An expanded Deluxe Edition, featuring the full score along with source music and previously unreleased alternate cues, was released in 2020.

Singing
Being also an opera singer, wrestler and actor Erland van Lidth performs in his role as Dynamo part of the aria "Hai gia vinta la causa... Vedro mentr'io sospiro"﻿ out of Mozart's Marriage of Figaro.

Release

Home media
Artisan Entertainment released the film on DVD in 2002, and again in 2004. The 2004 release includes new special features, audio commentaries and surround sound mix.

On February 9, 2010, Lionsgate released the film on Blu-ray with a 7.1 surround sound mix.

Olive Films (under licence from Paramount, who owns the film due to having the Taft Pictures library) re-released the film on DVD and Blu-ray, with the original 2-channel surround mix, on February 19, 2013.

In 2022, for the film’s 35th anniversary, Paramount Home Entertainment announced an Ultra HD 4K Blu-ray release of the film on November 8, 2022. The disc will include HDR-10, Dolby Vision, and the 7.1 surround mix.

Paramount also owns the TV and streaming rights.

Reception

Box office

In The Running Mans opening weekend, it was released in 1,692 theaters and grossed $8,117,465. The film's total domestic gross was $38,122,105.

Critical response
Roger Ebert of the Chicago Sun-Times gave the film two-and-a-half stars out of four, complaining that "all the action scenes are versions of the same scenario", but praised Dawson's performance, stating that he "has at last found the role he was born to play." Vincent Canby of The New York Times wrote that the film "has the manners and gadgetry of a sci-fi adventure film, but is, at heart, an engagingly mean, cruel, nasty, funny send-up of television. It's not quite Network, but then it also doesn't take itself too seriously." Variety wrote that the film "coarsens the star's hitherto winning formula" and "works only on a pure action level," calling the satire "paperthin and constantly contradicted by the film wallowing in the sort of mindless violence for the roller derby-addicted masses it is supposedly criticizing." Dave Kehr of the Chicago Tribune gave the film two stars out of four and wrote, "It's a format all right, but it may be too much of a format for a feature-length film. With Arnold Schwarzenegger, a former state security officer framed as the perpetrator of a notorious public massacre, sitting in as victim-of-the-week, The Running Man has little to do but run through the game's four stages." Michael Wilmington of the Los Angeles Times declared, "The Running Man is, by far, Schwarzenegger's best vehicle since The Terminator—not such high praise if you recall what came in between—and it suggests that his Frank Frazetta frame shows best in these fantasy sci-fi settings ... For the right audience, it'll be fun. It's for action fans with a taste for something off the beaten track—but not too far." Rita Kempley of The Washington Post called the film "a fast-paced, futuristic purée of Beat the Clock, Max Headroom, professional wrestling and The Most Dangerous Game. Pumped and primed for self-parody, the burly star proves as funny as he is ferocious in this tough guy's commentary on America's preoccupation with violence and game shows."

On Rotten Tomatoes the film has a score of 67% based on reviews from 45 critics, with an average rating of 5.6/10. The site's critical consensus states, "The Running Man is winking sci-fi satire with ridiculous clothes and workmanlike direction". On Metacritic the film holds a score of 45 out of 100 based on reviews from 12 critics, indicating "mixed or average reviews". Audiences polled by CinemaScore gave the film an average grade of "B+" on an A+ to F scale.

On the film's 30th anniversary in 2017, The Running Man was cited by a BBC journalist as having made accurate predictions about life in 2017, including an economic collapse, and offering a critique of American television culture. The film's writer Steven de Souza himself reinforced these predictions in a podcast interview with Vice Magazines "Motherboard" section. Reed Tucker of the New York Post said in 2019 that the film "correctly predicted ... the widening gap between the rich and poor", depicting homeless shantytowns and skyscrapers for the wealthy resembling the real New York City and Los Angeles, and societal obsession with reality TV. De Souza said one of the producers of American Gladiators sold his show with clips from The Running Man, telling the network "We're doing exactly this, except the murdering part".

Other media

Video game

In 1989, a video game based on the film was released for the MSX, ZX Spectrum, Commodore 64, Amstrad CPC, Amiga, and Atari ST. The game was developed by Emerald Software and published by Grandslam Entertainments.

The 1990 video game Smash TV was inspired by The Running Man.

Remake
On February 19, 2021, Paramount Pictures announced that it would make a new film adaptation of the novel, one that would be more faithful to the source material. Edgar Wright will direct and reimagine the story with Michael Bacall, the latter of whom will pen the screenplay. Simon Kinberg and Audrey Chon will produce through Kinberg's Genre Films banner, alongside Nira Park from Wright's Complete Fiction banner.

References

External links

 
 
 
 
 

1987 films
1980s chase films
1980s science fiction action films
1980s dystopian films
American chase films
American science fiction action films
American dystopian films
Films about death games
Films about television
Films based on American novels
Films based on science fiction novels
Films based on works by Stephen King
Films directed by Paul Michael Glaser
Films scored by Harold Faltermeyer
Films set in the future
Films set in 2017
Films set in 2019
Films set in Los Angeles
Films shot in Los Angeles
Social science fiction films
TriStar Pictures films
Taft Entertainment Pictures films
Films produced by George Linder
Films produced by Tim Zinnemann
Films with screenplays by Steven E. de Souza
1980s English-language films
1980s American films